Pauls Butkēvičs (born 8 August 1940, in Riga) is a Latvian film and theater actor, best known for starring in I Remember Everything, Richard and Elpojiet dziļi! (1967, also known as Četri balti krekli). He also starred in Ilgais ceļš kāpās, Rallijs (1978), Nepabeigtās vakariņas (1979), Mirāža (1981) and Aija (1987).

Background 
After graduating from Riga Secondary School No. 11 in 1959, Butkēvičs enrolled at the Riga Polytechnical Institute and started work as an automatic phone line regulator at VEF. At the same time he performed at the Roberts Ligers Riga Pantomime Ensemble from 1957 to 1959 and the Experimental studio no. 3 of the Dailes Theatre from 1959 to 1961. Later he studied at the Law and the History and Philosophy faculties of the University of Latvia and the Choir Conductor Section of the Latvian Conservatory of Music from 1964 to 1966.

His life partner is Zinta Jansone, a former costume designer for Latvian Television.

Career 
Pauls Butkēvičs has starred in approximately 150 films both in Latvia and abroad. He was awarded the title of Merited Artist of the Russian SFSR in 1990.

Filmography
 Es visu atceros, Ričard (Я всё помню, Ричард, 1966) as Zigis Purmalis
 Elpojiet dziļi! (1967) as Ralfs
 Silnye dukhom (1967)
 Daleko na zapade (1968)
 Troynaya proverka (1969)
 Vozvrashcheniye 'Svyatogo Luki''' (1970) as Keit, a foreign tourist
 Waterloo (1970/I) (uncredited) as  Officer with Wellington
 Gorod pod lipami (Epizody geroicheskoy oborony) (Pilsēta zem liepām, 1971)
 Shakh koroleve brilliantov (1973)
  Seventeen Moments of Spring (Семнадцать мгновений весны, 1973)  as Agent (unknown episodes)
 If You Want to Be Happy (1974)
 Gnev (1974)
 Rallijs (Rallye / Ралли, 1978)
 Almaznaya tropa (1978)
 The Fortress (1978)  also known as Kristman Agent sekretnoy sluzhby (1978)
 Aquanauts (1979)  as Dugovsky
 The Fairfax Millions (1980)
 Unfinished Supper (Nepabeigtās vakariņas / Незаконченный ужин, 1980) as Backlund
 Ispanskiy variant (1980)
 Korpus generala Shubnikova (1980)
 Koltso iz Amsterdama (1981)
 Sindikat-2 (1981) as Krikman
 The Error of Tony Wendis (1981) as Max
 Nezhnost k revushemu zveryu (1982) as Sanin
 Incident at Map Grid 36-80 (Случай в квадрате 36-80, 1982) as Terner
 Seven elements (1984)
 Nabat na rassvete (1985)
 Day of Wrath (1985)    
 Bagrationi (1985)
 Sem krikov v okeane (1986)
 The Dolphin's Cry (1986)
 Ot zarplaty do zarplaty (1986)
 Perekhvat (1986)
 Bez sroka davnosti (1986)
 Za yavnym preimushchestvom (1986) as Sumarokov
 Gardemarines ahead! (Гардемарины, вперёд!, 1988) as Berger
 The Adventures of Quentin Durward, Marksman of the Royal Guard (1988) 
 Sluchay v aeroportu (1988) (TV)
 Rokovaya oshibka (1988)
 Viva gardemarines! (Виват, гардемарины!, 1991) as Frederick the Great
 The Shroud of Alexander Nevsky (1992) 
 Three Days in August (1992)
 The Hounds of Riga (Hundarna av Riga, 1995) as Col. Potris (Putnis)
 The Hostage (Ķīlnieks, 2006) as Antons

 Other Interests 
A while back actor said that to complete his life's work he wants to write a play, play in it, write a book and record a music album.

Writing
First Paul decided to write a book. He was still living in Jūrmala, where his neighbor journalist Vija Apinīte was very excited about making a biographical book about Paul Butkevich, so after the actor had collected his materials and thoughts about his life and roles on paper, she systematized it all and in 2001 they published a 237-page thick book Kājām pa Ugunszemi(Rīga : Sol Vita). Presentation photos are here...
While teaching musical acting course in Baltic Russian Institute he got inspired and wrote a musical play Es visur aicināts un izraidīts based on 15th to 20th century Russian poetry. Sung in Russian on the stage of Daugavpils Theatre, premiered on 13 January 2005, has been shown in several schools, recreation centers and libraries, and there has been also road-shows in Russia

 Music 
Pauls Butkēvičs together with the army ensemble Zvaigznīte (Little Star) performed the original soundtrack of the movie Elpojiet dziļi! (Breathe Deeply!).
Surprisingly enough, even though the film itself was not shown to public till the end of 80s, its songs, written by the acclaimed Latvian composer Imants Kalniņš, became very popular among Latvian society, and later were performed by Latvian bands ‘Menuets’ and ‘Turaidas roze’. However, as, for example, Hardijs Lediņš put it: ‘I think that nobody has performed the songs by Imants Kalniņš better than Pauls Butkēvičs, - neither ‘Menuets’, nor ‘Turaidas roze’ did’
The members of the ensemble ‘Zvaigznīte’ included such later well-known Latvian musicians as Uldis Stabulnieks, Gunārs Rozenbergs, Dzintars Beķeris, Valdis Eglītis, Andris Vilsons and Jūnijs Vilsons.
In 2008 Paul Butkevich together with Elina Cileviča engaged in a new musical project and recorded an album Tu esi, Tu biji, Tu būsi''.
Butkevich dreams of recording another album in the future with the songs in Russian of his performance 'Es visur aicināts un izraidīts'.

References

External links

1940 births
Living people
Latvian male film actors
Latvian male stage actors
Latvian male television actors
20th-century Latvian male actors
21st-century Latvian male actors
Actors from Riga